Supermarket shortages have been identified in many American urban neighborhoods, and such gaps in food access have been closely correlated with diet-related diseases such as cancer, obesity, and diabetes. The shortage began when many supermarkets left mixed-income central city neighborhoods after civil disturbances in the late 1960s and 1970s. By 1984, store openings exceeded closings nationally but the opposite held in cities and the trend continues.  The reluctance of large chains to open in urban areas is termed by some activists, "supermarket redlining."

Studies suggest that 21 of America's largest cities experience a grocery gap characterized by fewer stores and less square footage per store. The poorest neighborhoods typically have about 55% of the grocery square footage of the best-off neighborhoods. The migration of supermarkets to the suburbs contribute to the creation of so-called food deserts.  Simultaneously, there is a lower prevalence of independently owned grocery stores in low-wealth and predominantly black neighborhoods and a greater proportion of households without access to private transportation in these neighborhoods.

Supermarkets generally provide food at cheaper prices than the bodegas and pharmacies that service inner-city areas. A study that compared supermarkets, neighborhood groceries, convenience stores, and health food stores in San Diego, California found that supermarkets had twice the average number of 'heart-healthy' foods compared to neighborhood grocery stores and four times the average number of such foods compared to convenience stores.

Causes
Grocery stores typically have only 1-2% profit margins, so the difficulties involved in running an urban supermarket are often seen as too costly in an already-risky business. A combination of other factors make urban neighborhoods seem less-than-ideal for grocery store executives.

Market
Urban stores in low-income neighborhoods generally have less demand for the profitable luxury goods that are more popular in suburban stores. Also, people who shop with food stamps usually buy fewer nonperishable items like toiletries and impulse items, the things that bring stores their highest profits.

Instead, urban stores must stock a variety of lower-volume items geared to multiethnic tastes. Compounding the problem, chain stores are generally unfamiliar with ethnic preferences. Chains tend to develop a formula that works for their core market, which consists of middle-class, white suburbanites.

One obstacle to supermarket growth is that developers tend to overlook the market potential of urban communities. Underserved, urban neighborhoods tend to be composed of populations with lower incomes on average, but the density of an urban environment also means that city neighborhoods tend to have more income per acre than suburban areas. Studies by the Initiative for a Competitive Inner City in Boston found that "nearly 8 million people who live in the nation's poorest urban communities have a combined $85 billion in retail spending power, which is far greater than all of Mexico."

Stereotypes
Prejudices have biased marketing research and prevented supermarkets from seeing the potential of urban locations. National marketing firms have provided grocery store executives with statistics derived from flawed modeling techniques. These statistics include erroneous information about population decline, the perpetuation of stereotypes about the people who live in urban communities, and miscalculated income information.

Meanwhile, media portray urban areas as poor and dependent, contributing to supermarket executives' skepticism. In fact, urban areas usually consist overwhelmingly of working households with a substantial share of middle-income people.

Security
A problem in urban and suburban stores alike, shoplifting is 6% to 8% of supermarket revenues. Fear of crime also acts as a big deterrent for investors, but some cities interested in developing new grocery stores have placed police stations near development sites in order to allay developers' fears.

Land
The expense and scarcity of land in urban environments pose some of the greatest problems for supermarket developers. Finding sites for urban development also involves fees, complexity, length, and unpredictability.

Today's suburban supermarket model requires more space than older, urban facilities can accommodate, meaning that urban supermarket development often requires the construction of new facilities. And, while suburban supermarkets are typically , urban supermarkets are only  on average. This means that urban supermarkets can sell significantly fewer products than suburban stores, which contributes to fewer profits.

Community issues
A grocery store's 24-hour lighting "does a lot for the sense of safety and community in the neighborhood," because supermarkets can be a safe haven. Citizens feel a "dramatic change in atmosphere," after new supermarkets are built.

In addition, new supermarkets can be used as location of community programs—health exams, nutritional education, eye exams, voter registration, birthdays for children, Western Union wire transfers so immigrants can wire remittances, selling event tickets, having Driver’s License renewal facilities, and providing phones for discount international calls. Besides contributing to a community’s overall well-being, such services make a grocery store more appealing to urban consumers: developing the services that urban citizens desire is a crucial way to make new supermarket development work.

By engaging with local organizations, supermarkets can create a link with a community that will contribute to security, reduction in shrinkage, and provide for better selection and effectiveness of employees. Organizations (such as churches) can help in hiring decisions, and security guards can come from the community. These make security more effective, bring jobs to communities, and make customers brand-loyal. Grocery should also confer with local religious officials about religious diets.

Stores should also keep in mind the shopping habits of urban consumers, who often rely on monies distributed to them at the beginning of each month. Stores may want to "staff to accommodate strong demand in the first two weeks of the month, slack purchases in the last week, and heavier traffic that purchases less per customer in general," according to the shopping habits of urban consumers.

Grocery stores should consider developing diversity departments within supermarket administration to identify minority-owned suppliers and potential employees.

Racial issues
Of 216 US census tracts studied, the ratio of supermarkets to residents for predominantly white areas is 1:3816 versus 1:23,582 for predominantly black neighborhoods. Only 8% of black Americans lived in a census tract with at least one supermarket; 31% of Whites live in a census tract with at least one supermarket.  In fact, aside from region and economic health, studies find that proportion of blacks in the population can affect an area's likelihood of having a supermarket.

Case studies
Many cities and states across the US have recognized the urban supermarket gap problem and have developed plans to address the issue of food access.  Additionally, the U.S. federal government established the Healthy Food Financing Initiative. The initiative provided more than $400 million in funding from the Treasury Department, USDA and Department of Health and Human Services to promote expanding access to nutritious foods, including developing and equipping grocery stores and other small retailers to sell healthful food in low-income rural and urban communities that currently lack this option.

Pennsylvania
In April 2003, Pennsylvania passed the nation's first statewide economic development initiative aimed at improving access to markets that sell healthy food in underserved rural and urban communities. The legislation devoted $100 million to agriculture projects, including the development of grocery stores and farmers' markets, and $40 million to support the development of 10 new stores in underserved communities across Pennsylvania.

The resulting Fresh Food Financing Initiative was a public-private partnership in association with The Food Trust started in 2004 with state seed funds. The program encouraged the development of new supermarkets by providing grants of up to $250,000 or loans of up to $2.5 million per store to defray the infrastructure costs of developing a new store. Up to 2009, $41.8 million in grants and loans have funded 58 stores.  Success of the initiative led to the creation of similar programs in at least seven states and cities, like the New York City Food Retail Expansion to Support Health (FRESH) program.

New York City

Like many other cities in the US, New York City faces a supermarket shortage that is closely linked to health epidemics. At the request of the Mayor’s office, the Department of City Planning studied supermarket need in the city and, in April 2008, found a widespread shortage of supermarkets. This shortage causes a lack of healthy, fair-priced food options for many New Yorkers who live in a food desert. Food access issues are partly responsible for the facts that diabetes now affects over 700,000 people in New York City, over 1.1 million New Yorkers are obese, and another 2 million are overweight.

Health problems are especially prevalent in minority communities, and statistics indicate a racial dimension to the crisis: Supermarkets in Harlem are 30% less common than on the Upper East Side, and while 20% of Upper East Side bodegas carried leafy green vegetables, only 3% of those in Harlem could say the same.

Three million New Yorkers live in neighborhoods with high need for grocery stores and supermarkets. Neighborhoods such as Central and Spanish Harlem and Washington Heights in Manhattan; Bushwick, Bedford Stuyvesant, East New York and Sunset Park in Brooklyn; Corona, Jamaica and Far Rockaway in Queens; areas of the South Bronx, Williamsbridge/Wakefield and portions of Pelham Parkway in the Bronx; and St. George and Stapleton in Staten Island show the greatest need for full-line supermarkets.

In February, 2008, Speaker Christine Quinn of the City Council announced the creation of a Statewide Supermarket Commission to identify state and local policy solutions to encourage new supermarket development and prevent supermarkets from closing. The Commission was led by the Food Trust and the Food Bank for New York City, in partnership with the City’s Food Policy Coordinator and the Food Industry Alliance. Simultaneously, the United Food and Commercial Workers Local 1500, which represents grocery store workers, is working to create healthy food options for all New Yorkers through supermarkets, Community-supported agriculture, urban agriculture, and farmers' markets.

The FRESH program attempts to increase access to full-service grocery stores in designated "underserved" areas with help in zoning incentives, abatements of land and building taxes for 25 years and other tax subsidies such as sales tax exemptions on building materials.

California

In Oakland's flatlands, the development of low-income communities, lowered real estate values, zoning restrictions, land parcel sizes and property taxes discouraged supermarkets and other full-service food retailers.  Corner stores, convenience stores and liquor stores took root where commercial parcels were too small to accommodate a grocery store.  Overall, supermarket penetration largely drove down the number of grocery stores in West Oakland from 137 in 1960 to 22 in 1980.  By the 1990s, many supermarkets in the flatlands also closed their doors to invest in more profitable areas.

By 2005, The California Endowment and its then-$26 million initiative California FreshWorks set out to increase availability of healthy food options by investing in grocery stores in low-income and minority communities. As of 2014, about $264 million had been raised from a variety of investors.

Illinois
The Illinois Fresh Food begun with a $10 million state grant was set up to finance full-service grocery stores in neighborhoods with little access to fresh foods.

Chicago's Retail Chicago Program is outreach program for retailers, brokers, and developers to introduce them to the many community retail development opportunities in Chicago and expedite their entry into these new markets by serving as a "One Stop Shop" to assist them during their site selection process.

Other states
Similar programs created after Pennsylvania's initiative include the New Jersey Food Access Initiative and Colorado Fresh Food Financing Fund ad at the city level with New Orleans Fresh Food Retailer Initiative and Cincinnati Fresh Food Financing Fund.

Economic effects
Besides causing a lack of access to healthy foods, the urban supermarket gap also means that inner city neighborhoods lack the jobs and tax revenues that grocery stores provide.

Strategies
Where supermarket developers have neglected some urban neighborhoods, city governments and non-profits can work together to market the potential of inner city areas to grocery store executives.  Chicago’s planning department provided an information guide with a database of suitable land parcels to executives at a grocers’ expo in 2005.

Many of Oakland’s existing food retail businesses are located within Redevelopment Areas, allowing them to qualify for redevelopment fund assistance.  The Food Systems Assessment Report for Oakland suggested the creation of Food Retail Enterprise Zones, whereby food retailers that provide nutritious foods in poor neighborhoods are exempt from Oakland business taxes. It also suggested programs, like the Green Business certification program could award “Green and Healthy Oakland” certification to retail establishments that stock food or offer menu items conforming to specific criteria (fresh, nutritious, local, etc.) 

Market leaders close urban stores, even if they are showing a profit, to focus on the most productive stores in the suburbs. But "operators in second and third place in a metro area may seek to expand their core clientele outside the highly contested, white suburbs to other areas and groups, such as the mixed-income neighborhoods and ethnic clients in the central city." Baltimore initially attracted "low-level" chains and "now, upscale, full-service stores wants to locate in areas they had previous ignored."

Executives’ fears of security costs may be easily abated: Rochester clinched the deal with a Tops supermarket by offering to locate a police station at the development site. Hiring locals as security guards helps decrease security issues and losses to shrinkage.

Criticism

Despite the widespread efforts to address supermarket shortages and food deserts, not all researchers are convinced that such areas are common. At least one medical review and a later government report have suggested that food deserts are relatively rare. Nevertheless, their purported existence continues to drive significant public health expenditures.

References

Urban decay
Urbanization
Food deserts